Stickneys Ferry was a settlement established in what became Tulare County after the Williamson Expedition of the Pacific Railroad Surveys of 1853 and before 1857, on what became the Stockton - Los Angeles Road and the crossing of the White River.  It was probably established sometime between 1854 and 1856 because of the Kern River Gold Rush.

Stickneys Ferry is shown on the Stockton - Los Angeles Road crossing of the White River, on the 1857 Britton & Rey's Map Of The State Of California.

The site of the settlement was on White River, about 4.66 miles west of Tailholt just below its confluence with Tyler Gulch at Telegraph Flat, in Tulare County.  This crossing was on the Butterfield Overland Mail route, south of Fountain Springs and north of Mountain House at Willow Springs in Kern County.

References

Former settlements in Tulare County, California
Ghost towns in California
Butterfield Overland Mail in California